Eat (NXT Soundtrack) (stylized as EAT (NXT Soundtrack))  is a soundtrack extended play (EP) by American singer Poppy. It was released on June 8, 2021 by Sumerian Records in promotion of the show WWE NXT.

Although no official singles were released, several of the songs were promoted at various events throughout 2021.

Background and release
Following the release of the ambient album Music to Scream To and the Christmas EP A Very Poppy Christmas in the second semester of 2020, Poppy revealed in an interview to the magazine Spin in December that she was working on her fourth studio album and other projects. On March 13, 2021, Poppy announced through her social media she would be performing a new song at the 63rd Annual Grammy Awards, The following day, the track "Eat" was performed for the first time, but was not released as a single at the time. A month later, on April 6, it was announced that Poppy would debut a new song on NXT TakeOver: Stand & Deliver. A cover of Adam and the Ants' "Stand and Deliver" and an original song called "Say Cheese" were performed at the event. On April 20, "Say Cheese" became the official theme song for NXT.

On June 8, Poppy returned to the show NXT and released the EP Eat (NXT Soundtrack) live, featuring "Eat", "Say Cheese" and three new songs. "Dark Dark World" was also announced as the theme song for In Your House.

Critical reception
Revolver Magazine praised Eat (NXT Soundtrack) as "some of her best work yet", calling it "heavier" and "skronkier". In June 2021, the EP was included in the magazine's list of 20 Best Albums of 2021 so far, and the title track was included in the list of 30 Best Songs of 2021 so far.

Year-end lists

Track listing

Release history

References

2021 EPs
2021 soundtrack albums
WWE NXT
Television soundtracks
Sumerian Records albums
Metalcore EPs
Metalcore albums by American artists
Poppy (entertainer) albums